General elections were held in Belgium on 20 November 1921. The result was a victory for the Catholic Party, which won 70 of the 186 seats in the Chamber of Representatives. Voter turnout was 91.1% in the Chamber election and 91.0% in the Senate election.

Elections to the nine provincial councils were held one week later, on 27 November 1921.

A Catholic–Liberal government led by Georges Theunis was formed following the elections.

Results

Chamber of Representatives

Senate
A constitutional change eased the requirements to be a candidate for the Senate. As a compensation, the number of senators elected by provincial councils was increased from 27 to 40 and a new type of senators was introduced: 20 co-opted senators. This gives a total of 153 senators.

Constituencies
The distribution of seats among the electoral districts was as follows:

Additionally, 20 senators were co-opted.

References

Belgium
1920s elections in Belgium
General
Belgium